Abasolo is a Basque surname. Notable people with the surname include:

Garbiñe Abasolo (born 1964), Spanish beauty pageant winner
Paul Abasolo (born 1984), Spanish footballer
Mariano Abasolo (1783–1816), Mexican revolutionionary
Alejandro Abasolo (born 1997), Mexican footballer

Basque-language surnames